Arnette Lamar Hallman (born October 19, 1958) is an American former professional basketball player.

College career 
Hallman began his collegiate career at Joliet Junior College before transferring to play for the Purdue Boilermakers, where he was a starter for his two seasons there. While playing for the Boilermakers, Hallman was renowned for his jumping ability and rebounding skills. He made 67 appearances for Purdue with 65 starts, averaging 8.4 points and 5.4 rebounds a contest. He made headlines when scoring the game winner against Magic Johnson's Michigan State Spartans in January 1979. In 1980, Hallman advanced to the Final four of the NCAA Division I basketball tournament.

Professional career
Hallman was selected by the Boston Celtics as the 46th overall pick in the 1980 NBA draft but never played in the National Basketball Association (NBA).

Hallman spent his first professional season playing for the Maine Lumberjacks of the Continental Basketball Association (CBA). In 1983–84, he played for the BC Giants Osnabrück in the German Basketball Bundesliga and in the FIBA Korać Cup. He spent five seasons playing for four teams in Portugal.

Career statistics

College

|-
| style="text-align:left;"| 1978–79
| style="text-align:left;"| Purdue
| 35 || 33 || 27.8 || .496 || – || .600 || 4.9 || .9 || .3 || .8 || 8.1
|-
| style="text-align:left;"| 1979–80
| style="text-align:left;"| Purdue
| 32 || 32 || 30.8 || .438 || – || .508 || 5.9 || 1.2 || .3 || .7 || 8.8
|- class="sortbottom"
| style="text-align:center;" colspan="2"| Career
| 67 || 65 || 29.2 || .464 || – || .561 || 5.4 || 1.0 || .3 || .7 || 8.4

Personal life
His son, Arnette Hallman, is a Portuguese-Spanish professional basketball player who has played in Portugal, Spain and France.

References

External links
College statistics

1958 births
Living people
African-American basketball players
American expatriate basketball people in Germany
American expatriate basketball people in Portugal
American men's basketball players
Basketball players from Chicago
Boston Celtics draft picks
Joliet Junior College alumni
Junior college men's basketball players in the United States
Purdue Boilermakers men's basketball players
Small forwards
21st-century African-American people
20th-century African-American sportspeople